State Avenue is a stretch of roadway in Wyandotte County, Kansas. Its western terminus is at both US 73 and K-7 in Bonner Springs, Kansas and its eastern terminus at North 4th Street in downtown Kansas City, Kansas. Its western terminus continues at both US 24 and US 40, turning south through Tonganoxie. Parallel Parkway runs parallel approximately eighth tenths of a mile to the north nearly the length of the road.

Cities traveled
State Avenue passes through the following cities:
Kansas City, Kansas
Bonner Springs, Kansas
Basehor, Kansas
Tonganoxie, Kansas

Major Junction
State Avenue largely consists of at-grade intersections. However, there are several roads only accessible by exit from State Avenue.

Exits are not numbered.
 in Kansas City, KS (State Avenue under K-7/US-73 bridge/partial-cloverleaf ramps)
 in Kansas City, KS (State Avenue under I-435 bridge/partial-cloverleaf ramps)
 in Kansas City, KS (State Avenue under I-635 bridge/partial-cloverleaf ramps)

References

Transportation in Wyandotte County, Kansas
Transportation in the Kansas City metropolitan area
Roads in Kansas